Werner Malitz (22 September 1926 – 28 May 2017) was a German cyclist. He competed in the team pursuit event at the 1956 Summer Olympics.

References

1926 births
2017 deaths
German male cyclists
Olympic cyclists of the United Team of Germany
Cyclists at the 1956 Summer Olympics
Cyclists from Berlin
German prisoners of war in World War II held by France